Bloodshed may refer to:
 Bloodshed (comics), a character in the Marvel Universe
 Bloodshed (film), a 2005 film by Jim McMahon
 Bloodshed (album), a 2004 compilation album by Krisiun
 "Bloodshed" (song), a 2013 song by Soulfly
 Bloodshed (band), a Christian hardcore band
 Blood Shed (2014 film), a horror film featuring Bai Ling
 Bloodshed Software, the developers of Dev-C++

See also
 Violence